Nordingrå is a locality situated in Kramfors Municipality, Västernorrland County, Sweden, with 306 inhabitants in 2010.

It is also a parish of some 50 villages, with a population of about 1500. Nordingrå is a part of the Höga Kusten (High Coast) World Heritage Site.

Notable residents
Tobias Enström, National Hockey League defenceman

References 

Populated places in Kramfors Municipality
Ångermanland